A Tolkien Compass, a 1975 collection of essays edited by Jared Lobdell, was one of the first books of Tolkien scholarship to be published. Some of the essays have remained at the centre of such scholarship. Most were written by academics for fan-organised conferences. The collection was also the first place where Tolkien's own "Guide to the names in The Lord of the Rings" became widely available.

Context 

J. R. R. Tolkien (1892–1973) was an English Roman Catholic writer, poet, philologist, and academic, best known as the author of the high fantasy works The Hobbit and The Lord of the Rings.

Tolkien's book The Lord of the Rings was published in 1954–55; it was awarded the International Fantasy Award in 1957. The publication of the Ace Books and Ballantine paperbacks in the United States helped it to become immensely popular with a new generation in the 1960s. It has remained so ever since, judged by both sales and reader surveys. The literary establishment was largely hostile to the book, attacking it in numerous reviews.

Contents 

The first and second editions contain the following essays:

 Lobdell, Jared. "Introduction".
 Christensen, B. "Gollum's character transformation in The Hobbit". 	
 Matthews, D. "The Psychological Journey of Bilbo Baggins". 	
 Scheps, W. "The Fairy-tale Morality of The Lord of the Rings". 	
 Perkins, A.; Hill, H. "The Corruption of Power". 	
 Rogers, D. "Everyclod and Everyhero: the image of man in Tolkien". 	
 West, Richard C. "The Interlace Structure of The Lord of the Rings". 	
 Miller, David. "Narrative pattern in The Fellowship of the Ring". 	
 Plank, R. "'The Scouring of the Shire': Tolkien's view of fascism". 	
 Huttar, Charles A. "Hell and the city: Tolkien and the traditions of Western literature". 	
 Kaufmann, U. M. "Aspects of the paradisiacal in Tolkien's work". 	

The first edition also contains:

 Tolkien, J. R. R. "Guide to the names in The Lord of the Rings".

The second edition also contains:

 Shippey, Tom. "Foreword".

Publication history 

A Tolkien Compass was published in paperback by Open Court in 1975. They brought out a second edition in 2003, adding a scholarly foreword by Tom Shippey. The book has been translated into French, Swedish, and Turkish.

Reception 

A Tolkien Compass appeared at a time when "in the United Kingdom at least, professing an interest in Tolkien was almost certain death for any hopeful candidate seeking entrance to a department of English". The first edition included Tolkien's "Guide to the Names in The Lord of the Rings"; Tom Shippey in his foreword called this "immensely valuable" and "deplored" the fact that the Tolkien Estate had demanded it be omitted from later editions. Shippey described the essays as written in the "Age of Innocence" before Tolkien studies became professionalised, and as such offering "freshness, candor, and a sense of historical depth" that cannot be repeated. He noted that some of the early predictions were wrong – for instance, Tolkien had not written much of The Lord of the Rings before the Second World War – but many others have been substantiated, such as Richard C. West's account of Tolkien's use of medieval-style interlacing as a narrative structure. Janet Brennan Croft has written that West's essay "has proven to have particularly long-lasting impact".

The Tolkien scholar Gergely Nagy called the book "a significant early collection". 

David Bratman described the book as "the first commercially published collection of scholarship from the Tolkien fan community." He commented that the essays were originally papers for conferences organised by fans, but were for the most part written by scholars, and that two of the chapters were seen by scholars as "classics in the field": Richard C. West's essay on "The Interlace Structure of The Lord of the Rings, and Bonniejean Christensen's on "Gollum's Character Transformations in The Hobbit".

Jean MacIntyre, regretting that scholars have paid relatively little attention to The Hobbit compared to his other novels, notes that A Tolkien Compass takes the children's book seriously with two frequently-consulted essays.

References 

Tolkien studies
1975 non-fiction books